Rostamabad (also Romanized as Rostamābād) is a village in Kolyai Rural District, in the Central District of Asadabad County, Hamadan Province, Iran. At the 2006 census, its population was 136, in 33 families.

References 

Populated places in Asadabad County